Events in the year 2023 in the Dominican Republic.

Incumbents 

 President: Luis Abinader
 Vice President: Raquel Peña de Antuña

Events 
Ongoing: COVID-19 pandemic in the Dominican Republic

Scheduled

 October 20 – November 5: Dominican Republic at the 2023 Pan American Games.

See also 

COVID-19 pandemic in the Dominican Republic
2023 Atlantic hurricane season

References

External links 

 
2020s in the Dominican Republic
Years of the 21st century in the Dominican Republic
Dominican Republic
Dominican Republic